Data-driven control systems are a broad family of control systems, in which the identification of the process model and/or the design of the controller are based entirely on experimental data collected from the plant.

In many control applications, trying to write a mathematical model of the plant is considered a hard task, requiring efforts and time to the process and control engineers. This problem is overcome by data-driven methods, which fit a system model to the experimental data collected, choosing it in a specific models class. The control engineer can then exploit this model to design a proper controller for the system. However, it is still difficult to find a simple yet reliable model for a physical system, that includes only those dynamics of the system that are of interest for the control specifications. The direct data-driven methods allow to tune a controller, belonging to a given class, without the need of an identified model of the system. In this way, one can also simply weight process dynamics of interest inside the control cost function, and exclude those dynamics that are out of interest.

Overview 

The standard approach to control systems design is organized in two-steps: 
Then, validation consists in constructing the uncertainty set  that contains the true system  at a certain probability level.
However, from an identification for control perspective, what really matters is the performance achieved by the controller, not the intrinsic quality of the model.

This is the main idea behind robust control design procedure, that aims at building frequency domain uncertainty descriptions of the process. However, being based on worst-case assumptions rather than on the idea of averaging out the noise, this approach typically leads to conservative uncertainty sets. Rather, data-driven techniques deal with uncertainty by working on experimental data, and avoiding excessive conservativism.

In the following, the main classifications of data-driven control systems are presented.

Indirect and direct methods 
There are many methods available to control the systems. 
The fundamental distinction is between indirect and direct controller design methods. The former group of techniques is still retaining the standard two-step approach, i.e. first a model is identified, then a controller is tuned based on such model. The main issue in doing so is that the controller is computed from the estimated model  (according to the certainty equivalence principle), but in practice . To overcome this problem, the idea behind the latter group of techniques is to map the experimental data directly onto the controller, without any model to be identified in between.

Iterative and noniterative methods 

Another important distinction is between iterative and noniterative (or one-shot) methods. In the former group, repeated iterations are needed to estimate the controller parameters, during which the optimization problem is performed based on the results of the previous iteration, and the estimation is expected to become more and more accurate at each iteration. This approach is also prone to on-line implementations (see below). In the latter group, the (optimal) controller parametrization is provided with a single optimization problem. This is particularly important for those systems in which iterations or repetitions of data collection experiments are limited or even not allowed (for example, due to economic aspects). In such cases, one should select a design technique capable of delivering a controller on a single data set. This approach is often implemented off-line (see below).

On-line and off-line methods 

Since, on practical industrial applications, open-loop or closed-loop data are often available continuously, on-line data-driven techniques use those data to improve the quality of the identified model and/or the performance of the controller each time new information is collected on the plant. Instead, off-line approaches work on batch of data, which may be collected only once, or multiple times at a regular (but rather long) interval of time.

Iterative feedback tuning 

The iterative feedback tuning (IFT) method was introduced in 1994, starting from the observation that, in identification for control, each iteration is based on the (wrong) certainty equivalence principle.

IFT is a model-free technique for the direct iterative optimization of the parameters of a fixed-order controller; such parameters can be successively updated using information coming from standard (closed-loop) system operation.

The control design objective can be formulated as the minimization of the objective function:

Given the objective function to minimize, the quasi-Newton method can be applied, i.e. a gradient-based minimization using a gradient search of the type:

 

 Take the following as gradient approximation: .

Noniterative correlation-based tuning 

Noniterative correlation-based tuning (nCbT) is a noniterative method for data-driven tuning of a fixed-structure controller. It provides a one-shot method to directly synthesize a controller based on a single dataset.

Suppose that  denotes an unknown LTI stable SISO plant,  a user-defined reference model and  a user-defined weighting function.

The goal is to minimize the following objective function:

 

 is a convex approximation of the objective function obtained from a model reference problem, supposing that .

The vector of instrumental variables  is defined as:

 

The correlation function is:

 

and the optimization problem becomes:

then, the following holds:

Stability constraint 

There is no guarantee that the controller  that minimizes  is stable. Instability may occur in the following cases:

 If  is non-minimum phase,  may lead to cancellations in the right-half complex plane.
 If  (even if stabilizing) is not achievable,  may not be stabilizing.
 Due to measurement noise, even if  is stabilizing, data-estimated  may not be so.

Consider a stabilizing controller  and the closed loop transfer function .
Define:

Theorem 
The controller  stabilizes the plant  if

  is stable
  s.t. 

Condition 1. is enforced when:

  is stable
  contains an integrator (it is canceled).

The model reference design with stability constraint becomes:

A convex data-driven estimation of  can be obtained through the discrete Fourier transform. 

Define the following:

 

For stable minimum phase plants, the following convex data-driven optimization problem is given:

Virtual reference feedback tuning 

Virtual Reference Feedback Tuning (VRFT) is a noniterative method for data-driven tuning of a fixed-structure controller. It provides a one-shot method to directly synthesize a controller based on a single dataset.

The main idea is to define a desired closed loop model  and to use its inverse dynamics to obtain a virtual reference  from the measured output signal .

The optimal controller is obtained from noiseless data by solving the following optimization problem:

 

where the optimization function is given as follows:

References

External links
 VRFT toolbox for MATLAB

Robotics
Dynamical systems
Control theory
Control engineering
Computational mathematics